Blizhneye Chesnochnoye is a rural locality (a selo) in Alexeyevsky District, Belgorod Oblast, Russia. The population was 125 as of 2010. There are 4 streets.

Geography 
Blizhneye Chesnochnoye is located 14 km northeast of Alexeyevka (the district's administrative centre) by road. Dalneye Chesnochnoye is the nearest rural locality.

References 

Rural localities in Alexeyevsky District, Belgorod Oblast
Biryuchensky Uyezd